The 1979 Baltimore Colts season was the 27th season for the team in the National Football League (NFL). Under fifth-year head coach Ted Marchibroda, the Colts again finished with 5 wins and 11 losses, fifth in the AFC East division.

With persistent shoulder problems, quarterback Bert Jones was sidelined; replaced by veteran Greg Landry, the Colts continued to struggle. Marchibroda was fired after the season in late December, and succeeded by Mike McCormack.

Offseason

NFL draft

Personnel

Staff

Roster

Regular season

Schedule

Standings

See also 
 History of the Indianapolis Colts
 Indianapolis Colts seasons
 Colts–Patriots rivalry

References 

Baltimore Colts
1979
Baltimore Colts